Fleming Blanchard McCurdy,  (February 17, 1875 – August 29, 1952) was a Canadian politician.

Born in Old Barns, Nova Scotia, he was elected to the House of Commons of Canada for the Nova Scotia riding of Shelburne and Queen's in the 1911 election as a Conservative. He was re-elected in the 1917 election for the riding of Colchester as a supporter of Sir Robert Laird Borden's Unionist government.

In 1916, he was one of the first parliamentarians to be appointed a Parliamentary Secretary, when he was appointed Parliamentary Secretary of Militia and Defence for Sam Hughes. He was also the Parliamentary Secretary of Soldiers' Civil Re-establishment. Upon his appointment to Borden's Cabinet in 1920 as Minister of Public Works he was required by the law of the time to resign his seat and run in a by-election. By this point it was customary for Cabinet ministers running in by-elections to be acclaimed however, the newly formed United Farmers party contested the by-election with a United-Farmers/Labour candidate. McCurdy opted to face this challenge by running as a Nationalist Liberal rather than as a Conservative and was re-elected, though narrowly. It is possible he chose this banner as the Unionist Party had formally changed its name to the National Liberal and Conservative Party by this time or as a means of facing down the threat from a left-wing candidate. In any case, Blanchard ran the following year in the 1921 election as a Conservative and was defeated.

References
 
 Debates of the Legislative Assembly

1875 births
1952 deaths
Conservative Party of Canada (1867–1942) MPs
Members of the House of Commons of Canada from Nova Scotia
Members of the King's Privy Council for Canada
Unionist Party (Canada) MPs